The Bouveault aldehyde synthesis (also known as the Bouveault reaction) is a one-pot substitution reaction that replaces an alkyl or aryl halide with a formyl group using a N,N-disubstituted formamide.
For primary alkyl halides this produces the homologous aldehyde one carbon longer. For aryl halides this produces the corresponding carbaldehyde. The Bouveault aldehyde synthesis is an example of a formylation reaction, and is named for French scientist Louis Bouveault.

Reaction mechanism
The first step of the Bouveault aldehyde synthesis is the formation of the Grignard reagent. Upon addition of a N,N-disubstituted formamide (such as dimethylformamide) a hemiaminal is formed, which can easily be hydrolyzed into the desired aldehyde.

Variations
Variants using organolithium reagents instead of magnesium-based Grignard reagents are also considered Bouveault aldehyde syntheses.

See also
Bodroux-Chichibabin aldehyde synthesis
Bouveault–Blanc reduction
Duff reaction

References

 
 

Addition reactions
Carbon-carbon bond forming reactions
Formylation reactions
Name reactions